I Want Too Much is the second album from Irish rock band A House. It was released in 1990 via Sire.

I Want Too Much sold poorly. A House was dropped from its label.

Critical reception
Doug Brod, in Trouser Press, stated: "This is one amazing record. From the gentle folky strum of the opening "13 Wonderful Love Songs" to "Small Talk," I Want Too Much reveals a band with an uncanny knack for witty pop that actually means something."

Track listing
 "13 Wonderful Love Songs"
 "I Want Too Much" 		 
 "Talking"
 "The Patron Saint of Mediocrity"
 "Shivers Up My Spine"
 "Marry Me"
 "I Give You You"
 "Now That I'm Sick"
 "I Think I'm Going Mad"
 "Bring Down the Beast"
 "Manstrong"
 "Keep the Homefires Burning"
 "You'll Cry When I Die"
 "Small Talk"

 All songs by A House.
 Produced by Mike Hedges.

"I Think I'm Going Mad" was released as a single (Blanco y Negra NEG43) with "I Want Too Much" as the B-side. The 12" and CD maxi-single versions also included "Why Must We Argue?" and "I Want Too Much, Part 3".

References

External links
 Entry for I Want Too Much at Discogs.com

1990 albums
A House albums
Albums produced by Mike Hedges
Sire Records albums